Macfarren is a surname. Notable people with the surname include:

Emma Maria Macfarren (1824–95), English pianist and composer, sister-in-law of George Alexander Macfarren
George Macfarren (1788–1843), English dramatist 
George Alexander Macfarren (1813–87), English composer, son of George Macfarren
Natalia Macfarren (1827–1916), singer and writer, wife of George Alexander Macfarren
Walter Cecil Macfarren (1826–1905), pianist and composer, brother of George Alexander Macfarren, and in whose name the Royal Academy of Music prize is awarded